Altın is a Turkish word meaning "golden" (comparable to Mongolian "altan"). It is also a common surname. Notable people with the surname include:

 Erhan Altın (born 1956), Turkish football manager
 Josef Altin (born 1983), British television and film actor
 Mehmet Altin (born 1959), Turkish weightlifter
 Salih Altın (born 1987), German footballer
 Şükrü Altın (born 1956), Turkish historian, novelist, educator, and painter
 Volkan Altın (born 1986), German footballer

See also

 Altin, a given name
 Altan, a Mongolian given name also meaning "golden"
 Koza Altın, a Turkish gold mining company
 Altın Koza International Film Festival

Turkish-language surnames